Pseudodichanthium is a genus of Asian plants in the grass family. The only known species is Pseudodichanthium serrafalcoides, native to Maharashtra and Oman.

References

External links
 Grassbase - The World Online Grass Flora

Andropogoneae
Monotypic Poaceae genera
Flora of Asia